Ogof Hen Ffynhonnau (sometimes known in English as Poacher's Cave) lies in the Alyn Gorge in Flintshire, Wales close to Ogof Hesp Alyn. It was discovered in 1978 after excavation allowed access to Dyer's Adit.  
Being below a dry river bed, the cave can be prone to flooding in wet weather.  There is a short ladder pitch just inside the entrance, and it makes a short trip suitable for novice cavers.

History

The name Poacher's Cave was coined during an acrimonious dispute between the Northern Pennine Club who were originally digging the entrance and the North Wales Caving Club who actually broke through one day while the diggers were away.  Different sides of the story are available.  The following account from the Northern Pennine Club provides some flavour of the dispute:

Remains of the old gate are in place and the cave is no longer locked, but the name has stuck.

References

Bibliography
 
 
 

Hen Ffynhonnau
Landforms of Flintshire